Stanowski (feminine Stanowska) is a Polish surname. Notable people with the surname include:

 Krzysztof Stanowski (born 1959), Polish civic leader
 Krzysztof Stanowski (journalist) (born 1982), Polish journalist
 Skip Stanowski (born 1944), Canadian ice hockey player
 Wally Stanowski (1919–2015), Canadian ice hockey player

Polish-language surnames